Keith Richard Osik (born October 22, 1968), is a former Major League Baseball catcher who played in the major leagues from -. He played for the Milwaukee Brewers, Pittsburgh Pirates, Baltimore Orioles, and Washington Nationals. He was drafted in the 24th round of the  MLB Draft. His brother was also a professional baseball player, but only played in the minors. He was born in Port Washington, New York, but now lives in Shoreham, New York.

Osik is currently the head baseball coach at Farmingdale State College, a Division III institution located on Long Island in New York. He was inducted into the Suffolk Sports Hall of Fame on Long Island in the Baseball Category with the Class of 2008.

External links

1968 births
Living people
Major League Baseball catchers
Baseball players from New York (state)
People from Port Washington, New York
Milwaukee Brewers players
Pittsburgh Pirates players
Baltimore Orioles players
Washington Nationals players
Buffalo Bisons (minor league) players
Nashville Sounds players
Durham Bulls players
Albuquerque Isotopes players
New Orleans Zephyrs players
Farmingdale State Rams baseball coaches